Charles Evis Whitehouse (January 25, 1894 – July 19, 1960) was a Major League Baseball pitcher.

Sources

Major League Baseball pitchers
Indianapolis Hoosiers players
Newark Peppers players
Washington Senators (1901–1960) players
Champaign Velvets players
Dayton Veterans players
Minneapolis Millers (baseball) players
Indianapolis Indians players
Newark Bears (IL) players
Baseball players from Illinois
1894 births
1960 deaths
People from Charleston, Illinois